Hombres de honor was a 2005 Argentine telenovela, produced by Pol-Ka and aired by El Trece. It starred Laura Novoa and Gabriel Corrado.

Premise
Hombres de Honor was produced by Pol-Ka in an attempt to emulate the success of Padre Coraje, a telenovela they had produced the previous year. It had a low rating, but the TV channel El Trece aired it anyway, refusing to cancel it. The last episode, with 14,7 rating points, had the highest rating of the program's history.

Plot
The action is set in Argentina in the 1940s. There are two mafia families, the Patter Nostra and the Onoratto, who control the traffic of alcoholic beverages and gambling, and wage territorial disputes in other areas, such as prostitution. Luca Onoratto (Gabriel Corrado), jailed for the murder of Carlo Andrea Patter Nostra's twin brother (Gerardo Romano), served his time in prison. The Patter Nostra killed Lorenzo Onoratto (Arturo Puig), Luca's parent, during his wedding. Luca tried to be accepted as the head of the family, and secretly loved María Grazzia Patter Nostra (Laura Novoa), the daughter of the rival don.

Cast
 Gabriel Corrado as Luca Onoratto
 Laura Novoa as María Grazia Patter Nostra
 Leonor Benedetto as Alberta Natale de Onoratto
 Arturo Puig as Don Lorenzo Onoratto
 Gerardo Romano as Carlo Andrea Patter Nostra
 Juan Gil Navarro as Rocco Onoratto/Patter Nostra
 Virginia Innocenti as Mónica Catalano
 Agustina Cherri as Ángela Capello/Patter Nostra
 Antonio Grimau as Comissair Mario Brusca
 Selva Alemán as Carmela Catalano
 Carina Zampini as Eva Hoffman
 Carlos Portaluppi as Pío Molinaro
 Alejandro Awada as Renato De Luca
 Roberto Vallejos as Silvio Urzi
 Carlos Kaspar as Dino Onoratto
 David Masajnik as Bruno Anselmo
 Fabiana García Lago as Amelia Bongiorno
 Andrea Galante as Bella Brusca/La Loba
 Lucas Ferraro as Danilo Onoratto
 Marina Glezer as Beatrice Rossinni
 Valeria Lorca as Andrea
 Sergio Surraco as Ciro Patter Nostra
 Elena Roger as Gabriela Onoratto
 Jorge Nolasco as Nelo Calvi
 Elvira Vicario as Stella Capello
 Beatriz Thibaudin as Anunciata Patter Nostra "La Nona"
 Magela Zanotta as Franca
 Sandra Guida as La Madama

References

   

2000s Argentine television series
2005 telenovelas
Pol-ka telenovelas
Television series set in the 1940s
2005 Argentine television series debuts
2005 Argentine television series endings